Diacrisia amurensis is a moth in the family Erebidae. It was described by Otto Vasilievich Bremer in 1861. It is found in the Russian Far East (Amur basin, Primorye), China, Korea and Japan.

The species of the genus Rhyparioides, including this one, were moved to Diacrisia as a result of phylogenetic research published by Rönkä et al. in 2016.

Subspecies
Diacrisia amurensis amurensis
Diacrisia amurensis nipponensis Kishida & Inomata, 1981

References

Arctiidae genus list at Butterflies and Moths of the World of the Natural History Museum

Moths described in 1861
Arctiina